Michael Pierce Donohoe (born May 6, 1945) is an American former tight end in the National Football League.

Biography
Donohoe was born in San Francisco, California, United States.

Career
Donohoe was drafted in the ninth round of the 1968 NFL Draft by the Minnesota Vikings and would go on to play his first three seasons with the Atlanta Falcons. During his final two season he would play with the Green Bay Packers. Donohoe spent the 1975 season in the World Football League with the Hawaiians.

He played at the collegiate level at the University of San Francisco where he was inducted into the Hall of Fame in 1988.

See also
List of Green Bay Packers players

References

Players of American football from San Francisco
Atlanta Falcons players
Green Bay Packers players
American football tight ends
San Francisco Dons football players
1945 births
Living people